Slobodan Danko Bosanac (born April 15, 1946) is a Croatian physicist, focusing in atomic and molecular physics, electromagnetic interactions and astrophysics. He is currently Professor of Physics at Ruđer Bošković Institute.

Bosanac graduated in Theoretical Physics from the University of Zagreb in 1968. He began his career with the R. Boskovic Institute in Zagreb, Croatia in 1969.

From 1969 to 1972, he pursued graduate studies at the University of Sussex, UK. In 1972 he was awarded his PhD in the field of molecular physics from the University of Sussex, and started postdoctoral research at the University of Bristol, UK.  In 1974, after two years of postdoctoral research at the University of Bristol, he obtained a research position and returned to the R. Boskovic Institute.

In 1977, Danko was awarded a one year Lady Davis Fellowship Trust grant. He conducted research at the Hebrew University of Jerusalem, Israel, on the problems of long lived states and energy transfer in atomic and molecular processes.

Between 1980 and 1998, Danko attained the position of Professor at the R. Boskovic Institute (1984) and was a visiting professor at:

 The University of Rome “La Sapienza”,  
 The University of Florida, Gainesville,
 The University of Kaiserslautern, Germany,
 MPI fur Stromungsforschung, Goettingen, Germany,
 The University of Sussex,
 Center for Astrophysics  Harvard & Smithsonian (ITAMP)
 Harvard University,  
 MIT, and
 Universidade Federal de Minas Gerais, Belo Horizonte, MG, Brazil.

Bosanac initiated the Brijuni Conference series (1986) and is currently the Brijuni Conference series Chairman. The purpose of the Brijuni Conferences is to ''bring an up-to-date perspective of the present state of a given topic with the fundamental scientific philosophy to stimulate a cross-disciplinary flow of knowledge and expertise from both the science and technology standpoints.'' The Brijuni Conferences hosted may esteemed speakers, including Sir Harold Walter Kroto, Nobel laureate. Sir Harold Walter Kroto was Co-Chairman the earlier iterations of the Brijuni Conferences.

Between 1998 and 2016 Bosanac authored or co-authored 4 books:

 S.D. Bosanac: Long-Lived States in Collisions, CRC, Boca Raton, (1988)
 J.N. Murrell and S.D. Bosanac: Introduction to the theory of atomic and molecular collisions, Wiley, (1989)
 S.D. Bosanac: Dynamics of Particles and the Electromagnetic Field, World Scientific, 2005
 S.D. Bosanac: Electromagnetic Interactions, Springer, (2016)

For his research, Danko received two Croatian State Prizes in science, in 1996 and 2012.

He was President of the Croatian Astronomical Society from 2008 - 2012.

In 2018, Prof. dr. Slobodan Danko Bosanac was appointed as the president of the Adriatic Aerospace Association, a non-governmental, non-profit and independent association established to foster research and development in the aerospace sector.

References

Croatian physicists
Faculty of Science, University of Zagreb alumni
Alumni of the University of Sussex
1946 births
Living people